William John Price (4 December 1903 – 22 June 1987), sometimes known as Johnny Price, was an English professional footballer, who was born in India. An inside left, he played for Brentford, Fulham, Port Vale and England at amateur level. His most significant spell was with Fulham from 1929 to 1937, who he helped to win the Third Division South championship in the 1931–32 season.

Club career 
Price began his football career in army football with the Coldstream Guards and the 10th Royal Hussars. Initially an amateur, he joined Third Division South club Brentford from Isthmian League club Woking Town in 1928. He scored on his only first team appearance for the Bees, in a 3–1 victory over Norwich City on Good Friday 1928. Price subsequently turned professional and played for Fulham between 1928 and 1937, with whom he won the 1931–32 Third Division South championship.

After making 204 appearances and scoring 53 goals for Fulham, Price joined Port Vale in May 1937 and scored two goals in 13 Third Division North appearances during the 1937–38 season. In November 1937, Price had his contract at The Old Recreation Ground cancelled by mutual consent, as he wished to travel south to work as a coach with Wimbledon. He later became the coach of Yiewsley, before his appointment as assistant secretary of Fulham.

International career 
While with Woking, Price won three England Amateur international caps. In 1929, he was invited to a trial with the full England team and was included in the Football Association XI for a tour of South Africa and Rhodesia the same year.

Career statistics

Honours 
Fulham
Football League Third Division South: 1931–32

References 

1903 births
1987 deaths
People from Mhow
Anglo-Indian people
English footballers
England amateur international footballers
Association football inside forwards
Coldstream Guards soldiers
10th Royal Hussars soldiers
Brentford F.C. players
Fulham F.C. players
Port Vale F.C. players
Isthmian League players
English Football League players
Association football coaches
20th-century British Army personnel